John Lee Hooker Plays & Sings the Blues is an album by blues musician John Lee Hooker, compiling tracks recorded between 1950 and 1952, some of which were originally released as singles, that was issued by the Chess label in 1961.

Reception

AllMusic reviewer Bill Dahl stated: "filled with 1951–1952 gems from the Hook's heyday".

Track listing
All compositions credited to John Lee Hooker except where noted
 "The Journey" – 3:37
 "I Don't Want Your Money" – 2:58
 "Hey Baby" – 3:22
 "Mad Man Blues" – 2:39
 "Bluebird" – 2:55
 "Worried Life Blues" (Maceo Merriweather) – 3:00
 "Apologize" – 2:57
 "Lonely Boy Boogie" – 3:16
 "Please Don't Go" (McKinley Morganfield) – 2:26
 "Dreamin' Blues" – 3:02
 "Hey Boogie" – 2:59
 "Just Me and My Telephone" – 3:14
Recorded in Detroit in mid 1950 (tracks 4 & 11) and on April 24, 1952 (tracks 1-3 & 5-9) and in Chicago on April 26, 1951 (tracks 10 & 12)

Personnel
John Lee Hooker – guitar, vocals
Eddie Kirkland – guitar (track 12)

References

John Lee Hooker albums
1961 albums
Chess Records albums